Kentucky Route 2049 (KY 2049) is a  state highway in the U.S. State of Kentucky. Its western terminus is at KY 1934 in Louisville and its eastern terminus is at U.S. Route 31W (US 31W), US 60 and US 60 Alternate (US 60 Alt.) in Louisville.

Major junctions

References

2049
2049
Transportation in Louisville, Kentucky